Aggiramudu is a 1990 Telugu-language film directed by S. S. Ravichandra and produced by M. Krishna and Shekar under the Sri Raghavendra Pictures banner. Venkatesh is in a dual role, Gautami and Amala played the lead roles. Music was composed by Chakravarthy.

Cast 

Venkatesh as Aggi Ramudu & Vijay (Dual role)
Gautami as Malli
Amala as Manasa
Sharada as Justice Janaki Devi
Satyanarayana as Sarpabhushan Rao
Allu Ramalingaiyah as Tatarao
Kota Srinivasa Rao as Mental Doctor
Babu Mohan as Bhuvagiri Babji
Sarath Babu as Ram Mohan
Narra Venkateswara Rao as Inspector
Chalapathi Rao as Phanibhushan Rao
Pradeep Shakthi as Sasibhushan Rao
Bhimeswara Rao as Bank Manager
Jayalalitha as Saroja
Hema as Manasa's friend
Nirmalamma

Soundtrack 

Music Composed by Chakravarthy. Music released on Cauvery Audio Company.

References

External links 

1990 films
Films scored by K. Chakravarthy
1990s Telugu-language films
Films directed by S. S. Ravichandra